Arveladze is a Georgian surname. Notable people with the surname include:

Shota Arveladze (born 1973), Georgian footballer
Archil Arveladze (born 1973), Georgian footballer, identical twin of Shota
Revaz Arveladze (born 1969), Georgian footballer, older brother of Shota and Archil
Giorgi Arveladze, Ex-Minister for Economics of Georgia (2006–2007)

Georgian-language surnames